Sheikh Abdul-Mahdi al-Salami (born 1955), commonly known as Abdul-Mahdi al-Karbalai, is a Shia Muslim scholar, best known for being the official representative of Grand Ayatollah Sayed Ali Al-Sistani in Iraq.

Role
Sheikh Abdul-Mahdi Al-Karbalai is based in Karbala, Iraq approximately 80 km from Najaf, where Grand Ayatollah Sayed Ali Al-Sistani resides. In practice, Sistani never delivers public sermons or speeches, and only releases official statements through Sheikh Abdul-Mahdi Al-Karbalai. The statements are later transcribed and posted on Sistani's official webpage, with the Grand Ayatollah's official stamp, indicating the authenticity of the remarks.

Sheikh Abdul-Mahdi Al-Karbalai is noted for having announced Grand Ayatollah Sistani's famous Fatwa (edict) obligating Iraqis to vote, and with the rise of terrorism, to join the military to oppose ISIS.

See also
 List of marjas

References

Living people
Iraqi Shia clerics
Iraqi Shia Muslims
Year of birth missing (living people)